China Eastern Airlines Flight 5510 is a domestic flight from Shanghai to Nanchang, which is carried out by An-24. On August 15, 1989, an An-24 with the fuselage registration number B-3417 crashed into Zhoujiabang about 240 meters away from the airport due to engine failure when taking off at Hongqiao Airport, killing 34 people. Only 6 people survived.

Accident

China Eastern Airlines Flight 5510 carried 32 passengers and 8 crew members, it was carried out by an An-24 manufactured in 1973 with the production serial number 37309006. At 3:46 p.m., the An-24 took off from Shanghai Hongqiao Airport from south to north, but during the takeoff, the right engine of the plane suddenly failed. The crew did not stop the takeoff, but took measures to correct the deflection problem. But this was of no avail, and the plane eventually skidded off the runway, banked to the right and touched down. The plane then rushed over the ditch and crashed into a river.

After the incident, the police from the Public Security Department of Hongqiao Airport rushed to the scene of the incident and rescued 6 survivors at the tail of the plane. The remains of the victims, the wreckage of the plane, luggage and cargo were salvaged within 12 hours, and Hongqiao Airport resumed normal operation.

See also
TWA Flight 800 (1964)
Air Algerie Flight 6289

References

Aviation accidents and incidents in 1989
Aviation accidents and incidents in China
5510
1989 disasters in China
Accidents and incidents involving the Antonov An-24